Sergeyevskoye is a rural locality (a village) in Vysokovskoye Rural Settlement, Ust-Kubinsky District, Vologda Oblast, Russia. The population was 10 as of 2002.

Geography 
Sergeyevskoye is located 22 km southeast of Ustye (the district's administrative centre) by road. Zubarevo is the nearest rural locality.

References 

Rural localities in Tarnogsky District